L.C. Anderson High School is a public high school located in the city of Austin, Texas, United States. It is a part of the Austin Independent School District. The school is named for Laurine Cecil (L.C.) Anderson who served as principal of Prairie View Normal Institute (now Prairie View A&M University), founded the Colored Teachers State Association of Texas (CTSAT) and served as principal of the original Anderson (then E.H. Anderson) from 1896 to 1929. L.C. Anderson opened at its current location on Mesa Dr. in 1973.

Extracurricular activities

State titles
Boys' Golf
Team: 1994 (4A), 1995 (4A), 1997 (4A), 1998 (4A), 2022 (5A)
Girl's Golf
Team: 2022 (5A)
Boys' Swimming & Diving
Girl's Swimming & Diving
Team: 1974, 1982
Girl's Lacrosse
2022 (5A)

Original Anderson High School
The original L.C. Anderson High School served as Austin's East Side high school, serving the city's African American population from 1889 until 1971. The original Anderson was housed at 4 different locations before it was closed in 1971 as part of desegregation efforts, the current high school was opened in 1973 at its present site. The school was originally named after Earnest H. Anderson, who served as principal of Prairie View Normal Institution from 1879 to 1885. In 1938, it was renamed for his brother, L. C. Anderson, who served as the school's principal from 1896 to 1929.

Previous locations:
 1889–1908: Corner of San Marcos St and East 11th St
 1908–1913: Olive St (became an elementary school until late 1940s)
 1913–1953: Corner of Pennsylvania Ave and Comal St (site of present day Kealing Middle School, building burned in the 1980s)
 1953–1971: 900 Thompson St (later served as AISD's Alternative Learning Center, building was demolished and reopened as the new site of Eastside Early College High School in 2021

The Yellow Jackets won the PVIL Football State Championship in 1942, 1956, 1957 and 1961 and finished runner-up in 1940 and 1945.

State titles
Football
1942 (PVIL 2A), 1956 (PVIL 3A), 1957 (PVIL 3A), 1961 (PVIL 4A)

Notable alumni
 Thomas "Hollywood" Henderson - NFL football player
 Dick “Night Train” Lane - NFL football player
 Willie Wells - Negro league baseball player
 Dr. W. Charles Akins - graduated in 1950 and served as a teacher at old Anderson and later as the 1st principal of the new Anderson from 1973 to 1982. Akins High School in South Austin is named after him

Notable alumni
 Rasmus Bach – basketball player
 Mehcad Jason McKinley Brooks – actor
 Kris Clack – basketball player
 Ben Fricke – NFL football player
 Alex Jones – radio host and conspiracy theorist
 Bobby Micho – NFL football player 
 Ron Nirenberg – San Antonio mayor
 Justin Ruggiano – former Major League Baseball player
Lee Tunnell - former Major League Baseball player

References

External links
 Anderson High School

Educational institutions established in 1973
High schools in Austin, Texas
Austin Independent School District high schools
International Baccalaureate schools in Texas
1973 establishments in Texas